KIF may refer to:
 Koyamada International Foundation (KIF), an international nonprofit organization
 KIF Kolding, a handball club in Denmark
 Kif Kroker, a character in the TV show Futurama
 Kingfisher Lake Airport, Ontario, Canada
 Knowledge Interchange Format, in computing
 Københavns Idræts Forening, athletics club in Denmark
 an alien race in the Chanur novels by C. J. Cherryh
 Kinesin superfamily protein

See also
 Kief